The PDU-5/B is an aircraft-deployed leaflet dispersal unit. It is derived from the CBU-100 "Rockeye" Cluster Bomb, developed by the U.S. Air Force around 1999. It was used successfully in Afghanistan and Iraq to distribute leaflets. In 2015, it was used again to drop 60,000 leaflets near Raqqa, Syria.

References

External links
 Designationsystems.net
 Lackland Tailspinner - Article mentioning PDU-5/B; Page 9 of 22
 Many variants of leaflet bombs; Pages 5-12 of 20
 Psywarrior.com "Psyop Leaflet Dissemination"

Aerial bombs of the United States
Military equipment introduced in the 1990s